Armanda Guiducci (Naples, 12 October 1923 - Milan, 8 December 1992) was an Italian writer, literary critic, and Marxist feminist. She was a major player in the feminist debates of the 1970s. She was the recipient of the Rapallo Carige Prize for Virginia e l'angelo in 1991.

References

Italian women novelists
20th-century Italian women writers
20th-century Italian novelists
Writers from Naples
Italian feminists
Marxist feminists
Italian Marxists
Women Marxists
Italian socialist feminists
1923 births
1992 deaths